Haddon Vivian Donald,  (20 March 1917 – 23 April 2018) was a New Zealand soldier, businessman and politician of the National Party. He was the oldest living former New Zealand Member of Parliament, and at the time of his death, was the highest-ranking New Zealand army officer of World War II living. During the war, Donald served as an officer for the 22nd Battalion rising to the rank of lieutenant colonel. After his military service, Donald represented Wairarapa in the parliament from 1963 to 1969.

Early life
Donald was born in 1917 at Masterton, the son of Vivian Everard Donald and Gertrude Blanche Donald (née Mills). He was educated at Nelson College from 1930 to 1932, and afterwards at Wairarapa College.

Military life
He joined the New Zealand Expeditionary Force in 1939. During the Second World War he was an officer in the 22nd Battalion, rising to the rank of lieutenant colonel. The history group of the Ministry for Culture and Heritage has an interview with Haddon on its website where he describes the events at the Maleme airfield as part of the Battle of Crete. Donald was awarded the Military Cross in 1942, and the Distinguished Service Order in 1945. In 1947 he was made an Officer of the Legion of Merit by the United States. He was twice mentioned in dispatches, in 1941 and 1942. Donald later wrote about his experiences soldiering in Greece, Crete and Egypt in the book In Peace and War: A Civilian Soldier's Story, published in 2005.

Political career
On his return from the war, he was a manufacturer based in the Wairarapa. He represented the Wairarapa electorate from 1963 in succession to Bert Cooksley, who retired after five terms. Donald held the electorate until 1969, when he was defeated by Labour's Jack Williams. He lost the election by 467 votes.

Donald worked for his family firm of Donald Presses Ltd for 50 years, and was chairman of the company from 1970 to 1986. He captained the New Zealand rifle team on five occasions. Donald lived in Taupō. In April 2013, Donald at 96 years old, visited the parliament for discussions with Defence Minister Jonathan Coleman and Speaker David Carter.

Personal life
Donald was married to Ana Beetham from 1947 until she died in May 2014, aged 90; she was buried in Masterton. The couple had four children and 14 grandchildren. Donald turned 100 in March 2017 and died on 23 April 2018 in Masterton, at the age of 101.

Honours and awards
Donald was awarded the Distinguished Service Order, Military Cross, Efficiency Decoration, and made an Officer of the Legion of Merit. In 1990, he was awarded the New Zealand 1990 Commemoration Medal. In May 2017, Donald received a telegram from Queen Elizabeth II commemorating his 100th birthday.

Bibliography

References

Citations

Sources 
 Books

External links

1917 births
2018 deaths
New Zealand Companions of the Distinguished Service Order
New Zealand Army officers
New Zealand businesspeople
New Zealand centenarians
Men centenarians
Members of the New Zealand House of Representatives
New Zealand military personnel of World War II
New Zealand MPs for North Island electorates
New Zealand National Party MPs
Officers of the Legion of Merit
People educated at Nelson College
People educated at Wairarapa College
People from Masterton
New Zealand recipients of the Military Cross
Unsuccessful candidates in the 1969 New Zealand general election